John Edward Tomlinson, Baron Tomlinson (born 1 August 1939), is a British Labour Co-operative politician.  He is currently a life peer in the House of Lords, and was previously a Member of Parliament from 1974 to 1979, and a Member of the European Parliament (MEP) from 1984 to 1999.

Early life
Born in London, Tomlinson was educated at Westminster City School and the Co-operative College in Loughborough. He later studied health services management at Brunel University, and in 1982 he was awarded an MA in industrial relations from the University of Warwick.

Professional  and early political career
Tomlinson was active in Yorkshire politics, secretary of Sheffield Co-operative Party and an executive member of Yorkshire Labour Party. He was the youngest councillor on Sheffield City Council from 1964. He worked as head of research for the Amalgamated Union of Engineering Workers 1968–70.

Parliamentary career
Tomlinson stood for Parliament without success in 1966 at Bridlington and in 1970 at Walthamstow East. He was elected to the House of Commons as Labour Member of Parliament for Meriden in the February 1974 general election, defeating the sitting Conservative MP Keith Speed. In the October 1974 General Election he retained the seat, defeating a new Conservative candidate, the former  Chairman of the Highway Planning Committee in the London Borough of Hammersmith, and Chairman of the Hyde Park Tories (the Conservative Party's open air speakers) Christopher Horne. He lost his seat in the 1979 general election to the Conservative candidate, Iain Mills.

During his five years in the Commons, he held a series of government posts:
 Parliamentary Private Secretary (PPS) to Prime Minister Harold Wilson (1975–76);
 Parliamentary Under-Secretary of State, Foreign and Commonwealth Office (1976–79);
 Parliamentary Secretary, Ministry of Overseas Development (1977–79)

After his defeat in 1979, he lectured at Solihull College of Technology.
After unsuccessfully standing in the new constituency of North Warwickshire at the General lect held in June 1983, in 1984, Tomlinson was elected as Labour Co-operative Member of the European Parliament (MEP) for the new euro-constituency of Birmingham West.  He was re-elected in the 1989 European election and in the 1994 election, but did not stand for re-election under the new list system in the 1999 election.

On 21 July 1998, he was created a life peer as Baron Tomlinson, of Walsall in the County of West Midlands.

He is currently Chair of the Association of Independent Higher Education Providers.

References

Sources
https://web.archive.org/web/20050608163239/http://european-convention.eu.int/CVs/pdf/TOMLINSON.pdf

External links 
 
 Voting Record — Lord Tomlinson (Public Whip)
 Announcement of his introduction at the House of Lords House of Lords minutes of proceedings, 22 July 1998

1939 births
Living people
Labour Party (UK) MPs for English constituencies
Councillors in Sheffield
Alumni of Brunel University London
Alumni of the University of Warwick
Labour Co-operative life peers
UK MPs 1974
UK MPs 1974–1979
Labour Co-operative MEPs
MEPs for England 1984–1989
MEPs for England 1989–1994
MEPs for England 1994–1999
Labour Party (UK) councillors
Parliamentary Private Secretaries to the Prime Minister
Life peers created by Elizabeth II